The Do Sono River is a river of Tocantins state in central Brazil. It is a right tributary of the Tocantins River.

The river has its headwater in the  Jalapão State Park, a fully protected conservation unit created in 2001.
It forms where the Novo and Soninho meet on the northwest boundary of the state park.

See also
List of rivers of Tocantins

References

Rivers of Tocantins